Richard P. Miller Jr., also known as Dick Miller, was an American business executive, academic administrator, and politician. He served as 9th president of Hartwick College from 2003 to 2008, and as mayor of Oneonta, New York from 2010 until his death in 2014.

Early life and education 
Miller grew up in Pittsford, New York, a suburb of Rochester. His father, Richard P. Miller Sr., was chief executive of the Rochester Community Chest, precursor of the United Way. After high school, Miller attended Middlebury College.

Military service 
From 1965 to 1967, Miller served in the U.S. Army, First Cavalry Division (Airmobile), attaining the rank of first lieutenant. As a forward observer in the artillery, he participated in action in the Ia Drang Valley, near Pleiku, Republic of Vietnam.

Professional and political career 
Miller joined Case-Hoyt, a commercial printing company, as a sales representative in 1967. By 1982, he was the President and CEO of the company. Miller held a variety of positions at the University of Rochester and eventually served as senior vice president and chief operating officer of the university from 1996 to 2000. He was a trustee of Hobart and William Smith Colleges, and served as the vice chancellor and chief operating officer of the State University of New York. On May 2, 2003, the Hartwick College Board of Trustees announced that they unanimously endorsed Miller to become the next president of Hartwick College.

During his time as president of Hartwick College, enrollment and endowment went up.

On May 10, 2009, Miller announced his intentions to run for mayor of Oneonta. A political Independent, he sought endorsements from all of the city's political parties to go along with his 'Collaborate for Oneonta' ballot line. Despite being a co-chairman for Republican state senator James Seward's reelection campaign in 2008, the city's Republican committee declined to endorse Miller and also declined him the chance to force a primary. The county Democratic committee allowed him to run in their primary, where he won with 77 percent of the vote. He raised over $11,000 for his campaign and won.

Miller ran for reelection unopposed in 2013.

Personal life and death 
Miller married his first wife, Barbara, upon graduating college in 1965. The couple had two children. The couple split and Miller married a woman named Andi and lived in a renovated fraternity house with her three children until his death.

On October 25, 2014, Miller committed suicide in his garage. Otsego County Coroner James Hurley said the cause of death was a self-inflicted gunshot to the head from a .22-caliber handgun. The death was considered unexpected and shocking.

References 

2014 deaths
Middlebury College alumni
Heads of universities and colleges in the United States
American academic administrators
21st-century American politicians
Suicides by firearm in New York (state)